The pond frog is a genus of true frogs.

Pond frog may also refer to:

 Central Asian pond frog, a frog found in China, Tajikistan, and possibly in Afghanistan
 Daruma pond frog, a frog endemic to Japan
 Green pond frog, a frog found in Pakistan, India, Bangladesh, and Sri Lanka
 Seoul pond frog, a frog found in Korea
 Yunnan pond frog, a frog found in China and possibly Myanmar

See also

 Frog Pond

Animal common name disambiguation pages